Nemo Link is an HVDC submarine power cable between Richborough Energy Park in Kent, the United Kingdom and Zeebrugge, Belgium.  The project is a joint venture between British National Grid and Belgian Elia.  The electrical interconnector is the first between the two countries, capable of transmitting up to 1,000MW at 400kV for an annual transmission capacity of 8.76TWh. The link has been fully operational since 31 January 2019.

History
In 2015, contracts totalling €500million were awarded to Siemens for the construction of the two onshore HVDC converter stations and to J-Power Systems Corporation for the cable system.  The contract for the laying of the actual cable was awarded to DeepOcean who completed the work in 2017 and 2018.

Route 
The offshore section runs from Pegwell Bay on the UK side to Zeebrugge beach in Belgium.

See also
 HVDC Cross-Channel, 2,000 MW between UK and France
 BritNed, 1,000 MW between UK and the Netherlands

References

External links
 
 4c page

Electrical interconnectors to and from Great Britain
Electrical interconnectors to and from the Synchronous Grid of Continental Europe
Electric power infrastructure in Belgium
Electric power infrastructure in England
HVDC transmission lines
Electrical interconnectors in the North Sea
Energy infrastructure completed in 2019
2019 establishments in Belgium
2019 establishments in England